Mike Lee (born March 22, 1963) is an American former professional tennis player.

An Arizona state singles champion at Sabino High School in 1980, Lee went on to play collegiate tennis for the University of Arizona, before turning professional in 1984. 

Lee's professional tennis career included an appearance in Wimbledon qualifying and a quarter-final run at the 1988 Hall of Fame Tennis Championships, which included a win over world number 32 Dan Goldie.

Two of Lee's sons have also won Arizona state titles.

References

External links
 
 

1963 births
Living people
American male tennis players
Arizona Wildcats men's tennis players
Tennis people from Arizona
Sportspeople from Tucson, Arizona